Arthur Galland (20 May 1891 – 26 August 1975) was a New Zealand cricketer. He played 45 first-class matches for Otago between 1914 and 1931.

Galland was born at Dunedin in 1891 and worked as a plumber. After his death in 1975 an obituary was published in the New Zealand Cricket Annual.

References

External links
 

1891 births
1975 deaths
New Zealand cricketers
Otago cricketers
Cricketers from Dunedin
South Island cricketers